Phyllonorycter laciniatae is a moth of the family Gracillariidae. It is known from Hokkaidō island of Japan and from the Russian Far East.

The wingspan is 6.5-7.5 mm.

The larvae feed on Ulmus japonica, Ulmus laciniata, Ulmus propinqua and Ulmus pumila. They mine the leaves of their host plant.

References

laciniatae
Moths of Asia
Moths described in 1967